Margot Rose (born July 17, 1956) is an American television and film actress, composer and lyricist.

Background
She attended Interlochen Arts Academy, the Yale School of Drama and the North Carolina School of the Arts. Margot began her career in 1975 working in theater (Godspell) and television commercials and was a member of the original company of I'm Getting My Act Together & Taking it on the Road at the New York Shakespeare Festival, then later at the Circle in the Square Downtown.

Career
Rose has guest starred on over sixty television series including: Hill Street Blues, E/R, Night Court, Star Trek: Deep Space Nine, L.A. Law, The West Wing, Judging Amy, Desperate Housewives, Law and Order: Los Angeles, Murphy's Law, The Mentalist and Numb3rs, among many others. She had a leading role in the 1992 Star Trek: The Next Generation episode "The Inner Light", one of the most widely acclaimed episodes of that series.

Rose has had a number of roles in films, including: 48 Hrs., A Civil Action, True Believer, Brewster's Millions and Hollow Man. Rose composed the music for the 2000 film Sordid Lives and the 2008 television series Sordid Lives: The Series. She also performed in the original Del Shores stage production of Sordid Lives in 1996 in the role of Bitsy Mae Harling.

Theater

Still Getting My Act Together
Equus
I'm Getting My Act Together and Taking It on the Road
Godspell
Sordid Lives
Largo Desolato
Last Summer at Bluefish Cove
Gay '90s Revue
Siblings
Robber Bridegroom
Working
Taken in Marriage
Uncommon Women & Others
Fixations
Goddess of Mystery
An Awfully Big Adventure

Filmography

Killer's Delight (1978) as Bar Patron
Report to Murphy (1982, TV Series) as Baker
Hill Street Blues (1982, TV Series) as Katy Bambridge
 Something So Right (1982, TV Series) as 2nd Club Act
48 Hrs. (1982) as Casey
We Got It Made (1983, TV Series) as Sally
Simon & Simon (1984, TV Series) as Molly Jessup
Never Again (1984, TV Movie) as Denise
E/R (1985, TV Series) as Sally
Brewster's Millions (1985) as Torchy's Waitress
He's the Mayor (1986, TV Series) as Kelly Enright
Foley Square (1986, TV Series)
Stranded (1986, TV Movie) as Anita
Starman (1986, TV Series) as Laurie
Night Court (1986, TV Series) as Charlotte Lund
Murder Ordained (1987, TV Movie) as Nancy Horst
Hotel (1987, TV Series) as Margaret Hudson
Hunter (1988, TV Series) as Mary Ressell
True Believer (1989) as Ms. Jessum
21 Jump Street (1989, TV Series) as D.A. Katherine Sullivan
Chain Letter (1989, TV Movie)
Freddy's Nightmares (1990, TV Series) as Mollie Roads
Equal Justice (1990, TV Series) as Debbie / Chris' Secretary
Eating (1990) as Party Guest #11
The Famous Teddy Z (1990, TV Series)
Howie and Rose (1991, TV Movie) as Lisa Hubbard
Star Trek: The Next Generation (1992, Episode: "The Inner Light") as Eline
A House of Secrets and Lies (1992, TV Movie) as Caroline
Her Final Fury: Betty Broderick, the Last Chapter (1999, TV Movie)
From the Files of Joseph Wambaugh: A Jury of One (1992, TV Movie)
Jack's Place (1993, TV Series) as Hillary Morgan
Dying to Love You (1993, TV Movie) as Agent McCormick
Lois & Clark: The New Adventures of Superman (1993, TV Movie) as Mrs. Powell
L.A. Law (1994, TV Series) as Mrs. Askoff's Atty. Cecily
Models Inc. (1994-1995, TV Series) as Marie Colvin
Beverly Hills, 90210 (1996, TV Series) as Kelly's Student Advisor
Star Trek: Deep Space Nine (1996, Episode: "Hard Time") as Rinn
Melrose Place (1996, TV Series) as Margeaux
Murder One (1996, TV Series) as Dr. Gretchen Hearn
Mr. & Mrs Smith (1996, TV Series) as Local newscaster
Chicago Hope (1997-1998, TV Series) as Attorney Elizabeth Moreno / Artina Reinhart
L.A. Doctors (1998, TV Series) as Dr. Meyer
A Civil Action (1998) as Donna Robbins
Damon (1998, TV Series)
Women: Stories of Passion (1999, TV Series) as Christina's Friend
Getting Away with Murder: The JonBenét Ramsey Mystery (2000, TV Movie)
The Pretender (2000, TV Series) as Agent Berger
Sordid Lives (2000, Composer)
Hollow Man (2000) as Mrs. Kramer
Grosse Pointe (2001, TV Series, Director / Composer) as Director
The Division (2001, TV Series)
Judging Amy (2001-2004, TV Series) as Atty. Adelle Perlmutter / Denise Toler
The West Wing (2004, Episode: "The Benign Prerogative") as Portia Colgrave
Plainsong (2004, TV Movie) as Betty Roubideaux
The Nine (2006-2007, TV Series) as Mary Sommers
Sordid Lives: The Series (2008, TV Series, Composer)
The Mentalist (2009, TV Series) as Belinda Sandborne
Law and Order: Los Angeles (2010, TV Series) as Warden Linda Jordan
Desperate Housewives (2010, TV Series) as Principal Harris
All About Christmas Eve (2012, TV Movie) as Ellen Wright

Audio work
 Tell Me a Story 3: Women of Wonder (Audio CD, narrator and singer)

Recognition
Of Rose's performance in the theatrical production of The Gay '90s Musical in 1997, Variety wrote the play "features the beautifully harmonized voices of Margot Rose, [Bill] Ledesma and [Bill] Hutton as a trio of gay friends who nurture and support each other throughout their lives".

Of her performance in the 1996 theatrical  production Sordid Lives Variety wrote "Also lending solid support are ... and Margot Rose as the well-worn Betsy Mae, whose gentle musical offerings of such ballads as 'Will the Circle Be Unbroken,' 'The Water Is Wide' and an original title song punctuate the onstage doings."

References

External links

1956 births
21st-century American composers
21st-century American women musicians
21st-century women composers
Actresses from Pittsburgh
American women composers
American film actresses
American television actresses
Living people
University of North Carolina School of the Arts alumni
Yale University alumni